Long Lake is a commuter railroad station  on Metra's Milwaukee District North Line in Long Lake, Illinois. In Metra's zone-based fare system, Long Lake is in zone J. As of 2018, Long Lake is the 192nd busiest of Metra's 236 non-downtown stations, with an average of 93 weekday boardings. Long Lake station is a stone covered shelter with a parking lot on Main Street and Decorah Avenue.

As of December 12, 2022, Long Lake is served (mainly as a flag stop) by 27 trains (12 inbound, 15 outbound) on weekdays, by 18 trains (nine in each direction) on Saturdays, and by all 18 trains (nine in each direction) on Sundays and holidays.

References

External links

Station from Google Maps Street View

Metra stations in Illinois
Former Chicago, Milwaukee, St. Paul and Pacific Railroad stations
Railway stations in Lake County, Illinois